Route nationale 3  (RN 3) is a highway of 91 km in Madagascar, running from Antananarivo to Talata Volonondry, Anjozorobe and the Lake Alaotra. It crosses the region of Analamanga and Alaotra-Mangoro.

See also
List of roads in Madagascar
Transport in Madagascar

References

Alaotra-Mangoro
Analamanga
Roads in Madagascar